Copper(II) azide is a medium density explosive with the molecular formula .

Uses
Copper azide is very explosive and is too sensitive for any practical use unless handled in solution.

Preparation
(Spectator ions omitted in reaction below).

It can be destroyed by concentrated nitric acid to form non-explosive products, these being nitrogen, nitrogen oxides and copper(II) nitrate.

References

Azides
Copper(II) compounds
Explosive chemicals